Malcolm Wilton Linton (born 13 February 1952) is an English former professional footballer who played in the Football League and the North American Soccer League as a central defender.

References

1952 births
Living people
Sportspeople from Southend-on-Sea
English footballers
Association football defenders
Southend United F.C. players
Leyton Orient F.C. players
Bath City F.C. players
Tampa Bay Rowdies (1975–1993) players
Los Angeles Aztecs players
Ebbsfleet United F.C. players
Tilbury F.C. players
English Football League players
North American Soccer League (1968–1984) players
North American Soccer League (1968–1984) indoor players
English expatriate sportspeople in the United States
Expatriate soccer players in the United States
English expatriate footballers